The High Bar Gang is a Canadian bluegrass band, based in Vancouver.

The band has been popular in their home province of British Columbia selling out many of their shows, and were asked to open for Blue Rodeo when they played in Vancouver. They were also nominated for a Juno Award in 2014 in the category "Contemporary Christian/Gospel Album of the Year", and  won "Vocal Group of the Year" at the 2014 Canadian Folk Music Awards.

In April 2015, Dave and Kirby Barber joined the group. The band has since performed at Vancouver Island MusicFest, Harrison Festival and the 2015 PanAmerica Games in Toronto.

Biography
According to the band's web site, Colin Nairne brought the group together in 2010 to play his favourite bluegrass songs.  Nairne was an original member of Barney Bentall and the Legendary Hearts, so Bentall must have seemed an obvious choice.

Bentall, Wendy Bird, Angela Harris, Eric Reed and Rob Becker also perform together as Barney Bentall & The Grand Cariboo Opry. The Grand Cariboo Opry is a charity event that Bentall has been hosting since about 2006, doing several performances a year throughout western Canada.

Discography

Albums
 Lost and Undone: A Gospel Bluegrass Companion - 2013
 Someday The Heart Will Trouble the Mind - 2016

References

 Exclaim.ca, The High Bar Gang Lost and Undone: A Gospel Bluegrass Companion, Stuart Henderson, Oct 29 2013
 Music News, The High Bar Gang Lost and Undone, Andy Sniper, 24 Dec 2013
 The Feldman Agency, The High Bar Gang
 North Shore News, The High Bar Gang Find Their Groove in Lost and Undone, John Goodman, Oct 25 2013
 Williams Lake Tribune, High Bar Gang Nominated for JUNO, Mar 21 2014

Musical groups from Vancouver
Musical groups established in 2010
2010 establishments in British Columbia
Canadian Folk Music Award winners